Nathan Edward Kendall (March 17, 1868 – November 5, 1936) was an American Republican politician. Kendall was a two-term U.S. Representative from Iowa's 6th congressional district and the 23rd Governor of Iowa.

Background
Born on a farm near Greenville, Iowa, Kendall attended the rural schools until the eighth grade. After moving to Albia, Iowa he began reading law at age fifteen, and was admitted to the bar in 1889.  He commenced practice in Albia in 1889. He was Albia city attorney from 1890 to 1892, then Monroe County Attorney from 1893 to 1897. In 1899 he was elected to the Iowa House of Representatives, where he served for ten years and ultimately became Speaker of the House during his last term.

Congress
In 1908 Kendall ran as a Republican for the U.S. House seat for Iowa's 6th congressional district, then held by incumbent one-term Democrat Daniel W. Hamilton. Defeating Hamilton in a close race, Kendall served in the Sixty-first Congress, then was re-elected in 1910, serving in the Sixty-second Congress.     He won the Republican primary in June 1912 over two challengers, but pulled out of the race in August, citing health concerns.  In all, he served in Congress from March 4, 1909 to March 3, 1913.  After returning from Washington, he resumed the practice of law in Albia.

Governorship
In 1920, Kendall was elected Governor of Iowa, defeating Democrat and future Governor Clyde L. Herring.  He served two terms, from 1921 to 1925.  He resided in Des Moines, Iowa, until his death on November 5, 1936.  His remains were cremated and the ashes interred on the lawn of "Kendall Place," his former home in Albia.

References

 
 National Governors Association profile

1868 births
1936 deaths
Republican Party governors of Iowa
People from Clay County, Iowa
People from Albia, Iowa
Iowa lawyers
Speakers of the Iowa House of Representatives
Politicians from Des Moines, Iowa
Republican Party members of the United States House of Representatives from Iowa
Burials in Iowa
19th-century American politicians
20th-century American politicians